O'Hara is an Anglicized form of the Irish name Ó hEaghra. The death of the eponym – Eaghra Poprigh mac Saorghus, lord of Luighne, in Connaught – is mentioned in the Annals of the Four Masters in 926.
Barratt O'Hara (1882–1969), American politician
Bernard O'Hara (born 1945), Irish historian
Catherine O'Hara (born 1954), Canadian actress
Charles O'Hara (1740–1802), British military officer
Charles O'Hara, 1st Baron Tyrawley (1650–1724), Irish soldier
Dane O'Hara, New Zealand rugby league footballer
David O'Hara (born 1965), British actor
Dorothea Warren O'Hara (1873–1972), American ceramic artist
Eddie O'Hara (politician) (1937–2016), British politician
Edwin Vincent O'Hara (1881–1956), American prelate of the Roman Catholic Church
Éilis Ni Dhuibhne (Elisabeth O'Hara; born 1954), Irish novelist
Frank O'Hara (1926–1966), American poet
Gerald Patrick Aloysius O'Hara (1895–1963), American prelate of the Roman Catholic Church
Geoffrey O'Hara (1882–1967), Canadian American composer, singer and music professor
George O'Hara (actor) (1899–1966), American actor and screenwriter
Gerry O'Hara (1924–2023), British film and television director
Glen O'Hara (born 1974), British academic historian
Helen O'Hara (born 1955) British musician, violinist
James O'Hara (quartermaster) (1752?–1819), American army officer
James O'Hara, 2nd Baron Tyrawley (1682–1774), British army officer
James G. O'Hara (1925–1989), American statesman 
Jamie O'Hara (footballer) (born 1986), British football player
Jamie O'Hara (singer) (1950–2021), American country music singer-songwriter, one half of the duo The O'Kanes
Jean O'Hara (1913–1973), American prostitute
Joan O'Hara (1930–2007), Irish actress
John Bernard O'Hara (1862–1927), Australian poet
John Francis O'Hara (1888–1960), American catholic cardinal and educator
John Henry O'Hara (1905–1970), American writer
John Kennedy O'Hara (born 1961), American politician
John Myers O'Hara (1870–1944), American poet 
Joseph O'Hara, several people
Justice O'Hara, several people
Kane O'Hara (c.1711–1782), Irish composer
Kelley O'Hara (born 1988), American footballer
Kelli O'Hara (born 1977), American actress and singer
Kid O'Hara (1875–1954), American baseball player
Loral O'Hara (born 1983), American engineer and NASA astronaut
Maggie Blue O'Hara, Canadian actress
Mario O'Hara (1946–2012), Filipino film director, film producer and screenwriter
Mark O'Hara (born 1995), Scottish footballer
Mary O'Hara (born 1935), Irish singer and harpist 
Mary Margaret O'Hara, Canadian singer-songwriter
Maureen O'Hara (1920–2015), Irish-American actress
Michael O'Hara, American volleyball player
Michael O'Hara, American writer and producer
Michael D. O'Hara (1910–1978), American jurist
Paige O'Hara (born 1956), American singer and actress
Pat O'Hara (born 1968), American football player, coach
Patsy O'Hara (1957–1981), Irish Republican hunger striker
Patrick O'Hara, Irish politician
Quinn O'Hara (1941–2017), Scottish-born American actress
Sally Brice-O'Hara (born 1953), American 27th Vice-Commandant of the U.S. Coast Guard
Shaun O'Hara (born 1977), American football player
Shawn O'Hara (1958–2018), American politician
Theodore O'Hara (1820–1867), American poet and Confederate colonel
Thomas J. O'Hara C.S.C., Ph.D., an American president of King's College, Pennsylvania
Tom O'Hara (1942–2019), American runner
Valentine O'Hara (1875–1941), Irish author and authority on Russia
Colonel Walter O'Hara (1789–1874), British army officer

Other individuals who use the name O'Hara
Robert O'Hara Burke (1820–1861), Irish soldier, policeman and explorer
Pat O'Hara Wood (1891–1961), Australian tennis player
Julia O'Hara Stiles (born 1981), American actress
Phi Phi O'Hara (born 1985), Portuguese/Filipino drag queen
Eureka O'Hara (born 1990), American drag queen
Asia O'Hara (born 1982), American drag queen

Fictional characters
Chief O'Hara (Disney Comics), Disney comic book character
Chief Miles O'Hara, character from the Batman TV show
Jack "Butcher" O'Hara, the Green Beret in the game series Commandos
 O'Hara, a major villainous underling from Bruce Lee film Enter the Dragon, played by Karateka Robert Wall
Juliet O'Hara, a main character in the American comedy-drama television series Psych
Kimball O'Hara, protagonist of Rudyard Kipling's novel Kim
Miguel O'Hara is an alternative futuristic version of the comic book superhero Spider-Man
Neely O'Hara, character in Valley of the Dolls
Scarlett O'Hara, literary protagonist in Margaret Mitchell's novel Gone with the Wind
Scarlett (G.I. Joe), a female character whose actual name is Shana O'Hara
Dr Eleanor O'Hara, a female main character from American medical comedy-drama TV series Nurse Jackie, referred to mostly as just O'Hara
Spike O'Hara, the main character in the NES game Ghoul School

See also

Eaghra Poprigh mac Saorghus, eponym and ancestor of the clan Ó hEaghra, King of Luighne Connacht, died 928
O'Hara (disambiguation)

References

Surnames of Irish origin
Irish families
English-language surnames
Lists of people by surname